The Delta State Lady Statesmen basketball team is the women's basketball team that represents Delta State University in Cleveland, Mississippi, United States.  The school's team currently competes in the Gulf South Conference.

History
The Lady Statesmen began play in 1925. They joined the Gulf South Conference for women's basketball in 1986. The Lady Statesmen won three consecutive AIAW titles from 1974 to 1977, led by coach Margaret Wade, who was dubbed the "mother of modern women's college basketball," and star player Lusia Harris, who was drafted into the NBA her senior year. They have won the NCAA Division II women's basketball tournament three times, winning them in 1989, 1990, 1992 (all coached by Lloyd Clark), while finishing as runner up in 1993 to North Dakota State. They are the only Division II women's team with over 1,000 wins. They have made the NCAA Tournament 27 times, with a record of 57–25.

AIAW Championships

NCAA Division II Championships

Postseason results

AIAW Division I
The Lady Statesmen made four appearances in the AIAW women's basketball tournament, with a combined record of 13–1.

References